Łukasz Pielorz (born May 23, 1983, in Jastrzębie-Zdrój) is a Polish footballer who currently plays for MFK Frýdek-Místek.

Career

Club
In July 2011, he joined Górnik Łęczna.

References

External links
 
 Łukasz Pielorz at Soccerway

1983 births
Living people
Polish footballers
Odra Wodzisław Śląski players
Górnik Łęczna players
Bruk-Bet Termalica Nieciecza players
People from Jastrzębie-Zdrój
Sportspeople from Silesian Voivodeship
Association football defenders